Dimkov Glacier is a 6 km long and 4.3 km wide glacier draining the western slopes of Solvay Mountains on Brabant Island in the Palmer Archipelago, Antarctica. It is situated southwest of Rush Glacier and west of Jenner Glacier, and flows southwestwards between Kondolov Peak and Sheynovo Peak to enter Duperré Bay south of Humann Point.

The glacier is named for the Bulgarian theoretician and practitioner of traditional medicine Petar Dimkov (1886-1981).

Location
Dimkov Glacier is centred at  according to British mapping in 1980 and 2008.

See also
 List of glaciers in the Antarctic
 Glaciology

Maps
 Antarctic Digital Database (ADD). Scale 1:250000 topographic map of Antarctica. Scientific Committee on Antarctic Research (SCAR). Since 1993, regularly upgraded and updated.
British Antarctic Territory. Scale 1:200000 topographic map. DOS 610 Series, Sheet W 64 62. Directorate of Overseas Surveys, Tolworth, UK, 1980.
Brabant Island to Argentine Islands. Scale 1:250000 topographic map. British Antarctic Survey, 2008.

References
 Dimkov Glacier. SCAR Composite Gazetteer of Antarctica.
 Bulgarian Antarctic Gazetteer. Antarctic Place-names Commission. (details in Bulgarian, basic data in English)

External links
 Dimkov Glacier. Copernix satellite image

Glaciers of the Palmer Archipelago
Bulgaria and the Antarctic
Brabant Island